This is a list of notable parks and gardens in Pakistan.

By type

Amusement parks
 Aladdin World, Karachi
 Aquafun Resort, Bahtar near Taxila
 Dino Valley Theme Park, Islamabad
 Go Aish, Karachi
 Japanese Park, Islamabad
 Jinnah Park, Rawalpindi
 Joyland, Lahore
 Jungle World, Rawalpindi
 Lake View Park, Islamabad
National Bank Park, Lahore
Oasis Golf and Aqua Resort, Lahore
 Shakarparian, Islamabad
 Sindbad Amusement Parks
Sozo Water Park, Lahore
Botanical Garden Jallo lahore
Jilani park Lahore 
Greater Iqbal Park Lahore
Gulshen E Iqbal Park Lahore 
Jallo forest and safari park Lahore

Botanical gardens

 Rose and Jasmine Garden, Islamabad

National parks

 Margalla Hills National Park

Zoological gardens

 Islamabad Zoo

Mughal gardens
 Shalimar Gardens
Sheikhuora Gardens
Wah Gardens

By region

Abbottabad
Ayubia National Park
Company Baagh
Lady Garden - otherwise known as "Cantonment Public Park", or historically, "Lady Gordon's Garden"
Lalazar Safari Park
Shimla Hill Park
Wild Life Park
World Cedar Park

Bahawalpur
Bahawalpur Zoo
Lal Suhanra National Park

Faisalabad
Jinnah Garden
Gatwala Wildlife Park

Gujrat
Shahbaz Shreef Park, Gujrat
Gujrat Zoo at Shahbaz Shreef Park, Gujrat
Nawaz Shreef Park, Gujrat
Ladies and Children Park, Gujrat
Zahoor Ilahi Park, Jalalpur Jattan, Gujrat

Hyderabad
Rani Bagh
Askari Public Park

Islamabad
Islamabad has many  notable parks and gardens, some of which are listed here:
Embassy of Argentina, Islamabad
Aquafun resort
Centaurus Mall Garden
Dino Valley Theme Park (Pir Sohawa road)
Fatima Jinnah Park
Islamabad Zoo
Japanese Park
Lake View Park
Margalla Hills National Park
National Herbarium 
Rose and Jasmine Garden
Shakarparian
Sukh Chayn F-8 Multipurpose Sports Ground
Sukh Chayn G-5 Multipurpose Sports Ground

Jhelum
Major Akram Shaheed Memorial
Lehri Nature Park

Karachi

The great fiesta water park
Sunway Lagoon water park
Cosy water park

Khairpur
Herbarium and Botanical Garden, Shah Abdul Latif University

Lahore

Multan
 Chenab Park
 Shah Shamas Park

Muzaffargarh
 Fayyaz Park
 Nawab Muzaffar Khan Park

Nowshera
 Kund Park

Peshawar
Army Stadium
Chacha Younas Family Park
Ghani Bagh
Jinnah Park, Peshawar
New Army Stadium
Bagh-e-Naran
Tatara Park
Shahi Bagh
Wazir Bagh

Rawalpindi
Ayub National Park
Jungle World
Liaquat National Bagh
Lohi Bher Wildlife Park
 Allama Iqbal Park
 Jinnah Park
 Roomi Park
 502 (Workshop) Park (also known as Zia Park)
 Playland, adjacent to Ayub National Park
 Army Race Course Ground

Sukkur
 Lab-e-Mehran

See also
List of museums in Pakistan
List of urban parks by size

 
Pakistan
Pakistan
Gardens in Pakistan
Parks and gardens